Polylactic acid, also known as poly(lactic acid) poly, lactic, acid or polylactide (PLA), is a thermoplastic polyester with backbone formula  or , formally obtained by condensation of lactic acid  with loss of water (hence its name).  It can also be prepared by ring-opening polymerization of lactide , the cyclic dimer  of the basic repeating unit.

PLA has become a popular material due to it being economically produced from renewable resources. In 2021, PLA had the highest consumption volume of any bioplastic of the world, although it is still not a commodity polymer. Its widespread application has been hindered by numerous physical and processing shortcomings. PLA is the most widely used plastic filament material in 3D printing. Its low melting point, high strength, low thermal expansion, good layer adhesion, and high heat resistance when annealed make it an ideal material for this purpose. Without annealing, however, PLA has the lowest heat resistance of the common 3D printing plastics.

Although the name "polylactic acid" is widely used, it does not comply with IUPAC standard nomenclature, which is "poly(lactic acid)". The name "polylactic acid" is potentially ambiguous or confusing, because PLA is not a polyacid (polyelectrolyte), but rather a polyester.

Chemical properties

Synthesis 
The monomer is typically made from fermented plant starch such as from corn, cassava, sugarcane or sugar beet pulp.

Several industrial routes afford usable (i.e. high molecular weight) PLA. Two main monomers are used: lactic acid, and the cyclic di-ester, lactide. The most common route to PLA is the ring-opening polymerization of lactide with various metal catalysts (typically tin octoate) in solution or as a suspension. The metal-catalyzed reaction tends to cause racemization of the PLA, reducing its stereoregularity compared to the starting material (usually corn starch).

The direct condensation of lactic acid monomers can also be used to produce PLA. This process needs to be carried out at less than 200 °C; above that temperature, the entropically favored lactide monomer is generated. This reaction generates one equivalent of water for every condensation (esterification) step. The condensation reaction is reversible and subject to equilibrium, so removal of water is required to generate high molecular weight species. Water removal by application of a vacuum or by azeotropic distillation is required to drive the reaction toward polycondensation. Molecular weights of 130 kDa can be obtained this way. Even higher molecular weights can be attained by carefully crystallizing the crude polymer from the melt. Carboxylic acid and alcohol end groups are thus concentrated in the amorphous region of the solid polymer, and so they can react. Molecular weights of 128–152 kDa are obtainable thus.

Another method devised is by contacting lactic acid with a zeolite. This condensation reaction is a one-step process, and runs about 100 °C lower in temperature.

Stereoisomers 
Due to the chiral nature of lactic acid, several distinct forms of polylactide exist: poly-L-lactide (PLLA) is the product resulting from polymerization of L,L-lactide (also known as L-lactide).
Progress in biotechnology has resulted in the development of commercial production of the D enantiomer form.

Polymerization of a racemic mixture of L- and D-lactides usually leads to the synthesis of poly-DL-lactide (PDLLA), which is amorphous. Use of stereospecific catalysts can lead to heterotactic PLA which has been found to show crystallinity. The degree of crystallinity, and hence many important properties, is largely controlled by the ratio of D to L enantiomers used, and to a lesser extent on the type of catalyst used. Apart from lactic acid and lactide, lactic acid O-carboxyanhydride ("lac-OCA"), a five-membered cyclic compound has been used academically as well. This compound is more reactive than lactide, because its polymerization is driven by the loss of one equivalent of carbon dioxide per equivalent of lactic acid. Water is not a co-product.

The direct biosynthesis of PLA, in a manner similar to production of poly(hydroxyalkanoate)s, has been reported.

Physical properties 
PLA polymers range from amorphous glassy polymer to semi-crystalline and highly crystalline polymer with a glass transition 60–65 °C, a melting temperature 130-180 °C, and a Young's modulus 2.7–16 GPa. Heat-resistant PLA can withstand temperatures of 110 °C. The basic mechanical properties of PLA are between those of polystyrene and PET. The melting temperature of PLLA can be increased by 40–50 °C and its heat deflection temperature can be increased from approximately 60 °C to up to 190 °C by physically blending the polymer with PDLA (poly-D-lactide). PDLA and PLLA form a highly regular stereocomplex with increased crystallinity. The temperature stability is maximised when a 1:1 blend is used, but even at lower concentrations of 3–10% of PDLA, there is still a substantial improvement. In the latter case, PDLA acts as a nucleating agent, thereby increasing the crystallization rate. Biodegradation of PDLA is slower than for PLA due to the higher crystallinity of PDLA. The flexural modulus of PLA is higher than polystyrene and PLA has good heat sealability.

Several technologies such as annealing, adding nucleating agents, forming composites with fibers or nano-particles, chain extending and introducing crosslink structures have been used to enhance the mechanical properties of PLA polymers. Polylactic acid can be processed like most thermoplastics into fiber (for example, using conventional melt spinning processes) and film. PLA has similar mechanical properties to PETE polymer, but has a significantly lower maximum continuous use temperature.

Racemic PLA and pure PLLA have  low glass transition temperatures, making them undesirable because of low strength and melting point. A stereocomplex of PDLA and PLLA has a higher glass transition temperature, lending it more mechanical strength.

The high surface energy of PLA results in good printability, making it widely used in 3D printing. The tensile strength for 3D printed PLA was previously determined.

Solvents 
PLA is soluble in a range of organic solvents. Ethyl acetate is widely used because of its ease of access and low risk. It is useful in 3D printers for cleaning the extruder heads and for removing PLA supports.

Other safe solvents include propylene carbonate, which is safer than ethyl acetate but is difficult to purchase commercially. Pyridine can be used, but it has a distinct fish odor and is less safe than ethyl acetate. PLA is also soluble in hot benzene, tetrahydrofuran, and dioxane.

Fabrication 
PLA  objects can be fabricated by 3D printing, casting, injection moulding, extrusion, machining, and solvent welding.

PLA is used as a feedstock material in desktop fused filament fabrication by 3D printers, such as RepRap printers. 

PLA can be solvent welded using dichloromethane. Acetone also softens the surface of PLA, making it sticky without dissolving it, for welding to another PLA surface.

PLA-printed solids can be encased in plaster-like moulding materials, then burned out in a furnace, so that the resulting void can be filled with molten metal. This is known as "lost PLA casting", a type of investment casting.

Applications

Consumer goods 
PLA is used in a large variety of consumer products such as disposable tableware, cutlery, housings for kitchen appliances and electronics such as laptops and handheld devices, and microwavable trays. (However, PLA is  not suitable for microwavable containers because of its low glass transition temperature.) It is used for compost bags, food packaging and loose-fill packaging material that is cast, injection molded, or spun. In the form of a film, it shrinks upon heating, allowing it to be used in shrink tunnels. In the form of fibers, it is used for monofilament fishing line and netting. In the form of nonwoven fabrics, it is used for upholstery, disposable garments, awnings, feminine hygiene products, and diapers.

PLA has applications in engineering plastics, where the stereocomplex is blended with a rubber-like polymer such as ABS. Such blends have good form stability and visual transparency, making them useful in low-end packaging applications.

PLA is used for automotive parts such as floor mats, panels, and covers. Its heat resistance and durability are inferior to the widely used polypropylene (PP), but its properties are improved by means such as capping of the end groups to reduce hydrolysis.

Agricultural 
In the form of fibers, PLA is used for monofilament fishing line and netting for vegetation and weed prevention. It is used for sandbags, planting pots, binding tape and ropes .

Medical 
PLA can degrade into innocuous lactic acid, making it suitable for use as medical implants in the form of anchors, screws, plates, pins, rods, and mesh. Depending on the type used, it breaks down inside the body within 6 months to 2 years. This gradual degradation is desirable for a support structure, because it gradually transfers the load to the body (e.g., to the bone) as that area heals. The strength characteristics of PLA and PLLA implants are well documented.

Thanks to its bio-compatibility and biodegradability, PLA found interest as a polymeric scaffold for drug delivery purposes.

The composite blend of poly(L-lactide-co-D,L-lactide) (PLDLLA) with tricalcium phosphate (TCP) is used as PLDLLA/TCP scaffolds for bone engineering.

Poly-L-lactic acid (PLLA) is the main ingredient in Sculptra, a facial volume enhancer used for treating lipoatrophy of the cheeks.

PLLA is used to stimulate collagen synthesis in fibroblasts via foreign body reaction in the presence of macrophages. Macrophages act as a stimulant in secretion of cytokines and mediators such as TGF-β, which stimulate the fibroblast to secrete collagen into the surrounding tissue. Therefore, PLLA has potential applications in the dermatological studies.

PLLA is under investigation as a scaffold that can generate a small amount of electric current via the piezoelectric effect that stimulates the growth of mechanically robust cartilage in multiple animal models.

Degradation 
PLA is degraded abiotically by three mechanisms:

 Hydrolysis: The ester groups of the main chain are cleaved, thus reducing molecular weight.
 Thermal decomposition: A complex phenomenon leading to the appearance of different compounds such as lighter molecules and linear and cyclic oligomers with different Mw, and lactide.
 Photodegradation: UV radiation induces degradation. This is a factor mainly where PLA is exposed to sunlight in its applications in plasticulture, packaging containers and films.

The hydrolytic reaction is: -COO + H2O -> - COOH + -OH-

The degradation rate is very slow in ambient temperatures. A 2017 study found that at 25 °C in seawater, PLA showed no loss of mass over a year, but the study did not measure breakdown of the polymer chains or water absorption.

Pure PLA foams are selectively hydrolysed in Dulbecco's modified Eagle's medium (DMEM) supplemented with fetal bovine serum (FBS) (a solution mimicking body fluid). After 30 days of submersion in DMEM+FBS, a PLLA scaffold lost about 20% of its weight.

PLA samples of various molecular weights were degraded into methyl lactate (a green solvent) by using a metal complex catalyst.

PLA can also be degraded by some bacteria, such as Amycolatopsis and Saccharothrix. A purified protease from Amycolatopsis sp., PLA depolymerase, can also degrade PLA. Enzymes such as pronase and most effectively proteinase K from Tritirachium album degrade PLA.

End of life 
Four possible end-of-life scenarios are the most common:
 Recycling: which can be either chemical or mechanical.  Currently, the SPI resin identification code 7 ("others") is applicable for PLA. In Belgium, Galactic started the first pilot unit to chemically recycle PLA (Loopla). Unlike mechanical recycling, waste material can hold various contaminants. Polylactic acid can be chemically recycled to monomer by thermal depolymerization or hydrolysis. When purified, the monomer can be used for the manufacturing of virgin PLA with no loss of original properties  (cradle-to-cradle recycling). End-of-life PLA can be chemically recycled to methyl lactate by transesterification.
 Composting: PLA is biodegradable under industrial composting conditions, starting with chemical hydrolysis process, followed by microbial digestion, to ultimately degrade the PLA. Under industrial composting conditions, PLA can partly (about half) decompose into water and carbon dioxide in 60 days, after which the remainder decomposes much more slowly, with the rate depending on the material's degree of crystallinity. Environments without the necessary conditions will see very slow decomposition akin to that of non-bioplastics, not fully decomposing for hundreds or thousands of years.
 Incineration: PLA can be incinerated without producing chlorine-containing chemicals or heavy metals because it contains only carbon, oxygen, and hydrogen atoms. Since it does not contain chlorine it does not produce dioxins or hydrochloric acid during incineration. PLA can be combusted with no remaining residue. This and other results suggest that incineration is an environmentally friendly disposal of waste PLA.
 Landfill: the least preferable option is landfilling because PLA degrades very slowly in ambient temperatures, often as slowly as other plastics.

See also 
 Acrylonitrile butadiene styrene (ABS) - also used for 3D printing
 Cellophane, polyglycolide, plastarch material, poly-3-hydroxybutyrate – biologically derived polymers
 Polilactofate
 Polycaprolactone
 Zein, shellac – biologically derived coating materials

References

External links 

 "Your plastic pal" | The Economist

Biodegradable plastics
Bioplastics
Polyesters
Synthetic fibers
Transparent materials
Thermoplastics
Articles containing video clips
Fused filament fabrication